In Mandaean cosmology, Tibil or occasionally Arqa ḏ-Tibil (lit. "Tibil-Earth") is the Earth (World) or earthly middle realm. It is separated from the World of Light (alma ḏ-nhūra) above and the World of Darkness (alma ḏ-hšuka) below by ayar (aether).

To reach the World of Light (alma ḏ-nhūra) from Tibil, Mandaeans believe that need they to establish laufa (connection, union) to be reunited with the World of Light. The laufa is re-created and reconfirmed by priests through rituals such as maṣbuta (baptism). Upon death, priests must perform masiqta rituals to help the departed soul successfully navigate from Tibil through the various maṭarta (watch-stations) that lie in between, in order to reach the World of Light.

See also
Gaia
Midgard in Norse mythology
Middle-earth in J. R. R. Tolkien's novels
Ki (goddess) in Mesopotamian mythology

References

Mandaean cosmology
Mandaic words and phrases
Earth in religion